A kurdaitcha, or kurdaitcha man, also spelt gadaidja, cadiche, kadaitcha, karadji, or kaditcha, is a type of shaman amongst the Arrernte people, an Aboriginal group in Central Australia. The name featherfoot is used to denote the same figure by other Aboriginal peoples.

The kurdaitcha may be brought in to punish a guilty party by death. The word may also relate to the ritual in which the death is willed by the kurdaitcha man, known also as bone-pointing. The word may also be used by Europeans to refer to the shoes worn by the kurdaitcha, which are woven of feathers and human hair and treated with blood.

Background
Among traditional Indigenous Australians there is no such thing as a belief in natural death. All deaths are considered to be the result of evil spirits or spells, usually influenced by an enemy. Often, a dying person will whisper the name of the person they think caused their death. If the identity of the guilty person is not known, a "magic man" will watch for a sign, such as an animal burrow leading from the grave showing the direction of the home of the guilty party. This may take years but the identity is always eventually discovered. The elders of the mob that the deceased belonged to then hold a meeting to decide a suitable punishment. A kurdaitcha may or may not be arranged to avenge them.

Illapurinja
An illapurinja, literally "the changed one", is a female kurdaitcha who is secretly sent by her husband to avenge some wrong, most often the failure of a woman to cut herself as a mark of sorrow on the death of a family member. Believed to be entirely mythical, the fear of the illapurinja would be enough to induce the following of the custom.

20th century

The practice of kurdaitcha had died out completely in southern Australia by the 20th century although it was still carried out infrequently in the north.

In a report in by the Adelaide Advertiser in 1952, some Indigenous men had died in The Granites gold mine in the Tanami Desert, after reporting a sighting of a kurdaitcha man. They were very scared and danced a corroboree to chase evil spirits away. Anthropologist Ted Strehlow and doctors brought in to investigate said that the deaths were most likely caused by malnutrition and pneumonia, and Strehlow said that Aboriginal belief in "black magic" was in general dying out.

Kurdaitcha shoes
Europeans also used the name kurdaitcha (or kadaitcha) to refer to a distinctive type of oval feathered shoes, apparently worn by the kurdaitcha (man). The Indigenous names for these shoes are interlinia in northern Australia and intathurta in the south. The soles are made of emu feathers, and the uppers of human hair or animal fur. Most of the early European descriptions state that human blood was used as the principal binding agent; however Kim Akerman noted that although human blood might indeed have been used to charge the shoes with magical power, it is likely felting was actually the main method used to bind the parts together. The upper surface is covered with a net woven from human hair. An opening in the centre allows the foot to be inserted.

In some instances the shoes were allowed to be seen by women and children; in others, it was taboo for anyone but an adult man to see them. When not in use they were kept wrapped in kangaroo skin or hidden in a sacred place. Although they were permitted to be used more than once, they usually did not last more than one journey. When in use, they were decorated with lines of white and pink down and were said to leave no tracks.

Spencer and Gillen noted that the genuine kurdaitcha shoe has a small opening on one side where a dislocated little toe can be inserted.

In 1896 Patrick Byrne, a self-taught anthropologist at Charlotte Waters telegraph station, published a paper entitled "Note on the customs connected with the use of so-called kurdaitcha shoes of Central Australia" in the Proceedings of the Royal Society of Victoria. The paper was described as a "...careful piecing together of kurdaitcha revenge technique from accounts obtained from old men in the Charlotte Waters area in 1892".

Aboriginal people also began to make kurdaitcha shoes for sale to Europeans, and Spencer and Gillen noted seeing ones that were in fact far too small to have actually been worn. Until the 1970s these shoes were a popular craft item, made to sell to visitors to many sites in the central and western desert areas of Australia.

Bone pointing

The expectation that death would result from having a bone pointed at a victim is not without foundation. Other similar rituals that cause death have been recorded around the world. Victims become listless and apathetic, usually refusing food or water with death often occurring within days of being "cursed". When victims survive, it is assumed that the ritual was faulty in its execution. The phenomenon is recognized as psychosomatic in that death is caused by an emotional response—often fear—to some suggested outside force and is known as "voodoo death". As this term refers to a specific religion, the medical establishment has suggested that "self-willed death", or "bone-pointing syndrome" is more appropriate. In Australia, the practice is still common enough that hospitals and nursing staff are trained to manage illness caused by "bad spirits" and bone pointing.

Examples
The following story is related about the role of kurdaitcha by anthropologists John Godwin and Ronald Rose:

In 2004, an Indigenous Australian woman who disagreed with the abolition of the Aboriginal-led government body Aboriginal and Torres Strait Islander Commission cursed the Australian Prime Minister, John Howard, by pointing a bone at him.

Notes

References

Further reading
Newspaper articles mentioning kurdaitcha, Trove

Aboriginal Australian health
Australian Aboriginal words and phrases
Curses
Witchcraft
Arrernte
Shamanism
Australian Aboriginal culture